Aaron Reardon (born 11 March 1999) is an Australian professional footballer who plays as a centre back.

Career

FFA CoE
In 2015, Reardon joined FFA CoE on a year's long scholarship leading up to the FIFA U-17 World Cup but did not debut or feature for the national team.

Brisbane Roar
Reardon signed his first professional contract with Brisbane Roar on 27 September 2018, penning a multi-year deal with the club. He made his professional A-League debut for the Roar on 2 January 2019, starting in a 2–2 draw against the Newcastle Jets at McDonald Jones Stadium.

Reardon was part of the 2018-19 Y-League championship winning Brisbane Roar Youth team, captaining the Young Roar to a 3–1 over Western Sydney Wanderers Youth in the 2019 Y-League Grand Final on 1 February 2019.

Reardon was released by the Roar on 7 September 2020, at the conclusion of the 2019-2020 A-League season.

Gold Coast Knights 
On 18 September 2020, Gold Coast Knights announced Reardon had signed on for the remainder of the NPL Queensland season.

Port Melbourne 
On 10 December 2020, Port Melbourne SC announced it had signed Reardon for the 2021 NPL Victoria season.

Honours
Brisbane Roar Youth
Y-League: 2018–19

References

External links
 Aaron Reardon at Soccerway

1999 births
Living people
Australian soccer players
Association football defenders
Brisbane Roar FC players
National Premier Leagues players
Bangladesh Football Premier League players
Brisbane Strikers FC players
Mohammedan SC (Dhaka) players